The BMK Group is a German electronics manufacturing services company headquartered in Augsburg. BMK Group specializes in PCB Assembly, engineering, testing and final assemblies of whole devices and modules. The company has locations in Germany and Czech Republic.

BMK serves companies from different industries such as medical devices, automotive, metering, consumers, rail technology or telecommunications. Apart from manufacturing and development BMK also focuses on product life cycle management, supply chain management, material management and after sales services.

History 
BMK Group was founded in 1994 as a management buyout by Stephan Baur, Dieter Müller and Alois Knöferle as BMK professional electronics GmbH. Formerly it was a subsidiary of AT&T Inc.

Group structure 
The Group is divided in three subsidiaries:

 BMK professional electronics GmbH: PCB assembly contract manufacturer with plants in Germany and Czech Republic
 BMK electronic solutions GmbH: focus on engineering and electronics development
 BMK electronic services GmbH: after-sales and data management

References

External links 
 Official website

Electronics companies of Germany